Jermail Porter (born May 24, 1986) is former American football offensive lineman and former wrestler. He was last a member of the Kansas City Chiefs. Porter was not selected in the 2009 NFL Draft since he did not play college football. He was signed as a free agent by the New England Patriots on April 27, 2009. He was later released, and in December 2009 signed with the Kansas City Chiefs. Porter was waived in June 2010.

Porter was Kent State's first All-American wrestler since 1986. Just like Stephen Neal, Porter did not play organized football in any rank, especially college. Similar to Antonio Gates, Porter was a scholarship athlete in another sport for the Kent State Golden Flashes and did not play football.

References

External links
Kansas City Chiefs bio
Kent State Golden Flashes bio

1986 births
Living people
Players of American football from Akron, Ohio
American wrestlers
Kent State Golden Flashes wrestlers
American football offensive tackles
New England Patriots players
Kansas City Chiefs players